Peda or Pera is a mithai from the Indian subcontinent. It originated from Mathura, Uttar Pradesh, India. Usually prepared in thick, semi-soft, its main ingredients are khoa, sugar and traditional flavorings including cardamom seeds, pistachio nuts and saffron. Its colour varies from a creamy white to a caramel colour. The word peda is also generically used to mean a sphere of any doughy substance such as flour or  khoa. Variant spellings and names for the dessert include pedha, penda (in Gujarati) and pera.

History 

Pedas originated in the city of Mathura in the present-day Uttar Pradesh. The Mathura Peda is the characteristic variety from the city. From Uttar Pradesh, the peda spread to many parts of the Indian subcontinent. Thakur Ram Ratan Singh of Lucknow who migrated to Dharwad (in the present-day Karnataka) in the 1850s introduced pedas there. This distinct variety is now famous as the Dharwad pedha. Kandi Peda from Satara in Maharashtra is another variety of peda. Dood peda, made famous by the Nandini Milk Co-operative in Karnataka, is another popular variety.

Preparation 

Fresh khoa is heated until it reaches a temperature of approximately 80 degrees celsius, after which sugar and cardamom powder must be added at a rate of 30g and 0.1g per 100g of khoa with continuous stirring. The proportions may vary by a little. When the temperature reaches around 50 degrees celsius the dough can be kneaded and converted into small round balls using palms.

Nutrition 

The calorie content of a peda can vary depending on the size, ingredients, and method of preparation. However, on average, a single peda can contain around 40-90 calories. It also has a good amount of protein, fat, sucrose and lactose.

Shelf life and Storage 

Pedas have a higher Shelf-life compared to few other milk-based sweets such as Rasgulla or Kalakand(last less than 2 days with refrigeration). It is attributed to their high sugar and lower moisture content. It usually lasts  3 days without refrigeration. In response to this challenge, techniques like vacuum and smart packing, adding anti-oxidants, and temperature control can increase the shelf-life of Pedas.

Variations 

Each region has its own method of preparation. Some of the most popular types of peda are Doodh peda/Mathura peda from Uttar Pradesh, Kunthalgiri peda and Dharwad peda from Karnataka, and Lal peda from Eastern Uttar Pradesh.In addition, there are variations with respect to flavor and texture- such as Plain peda, Kesar peda, and Brown peda. To embrace a healthier, low-fat lifestyle, there are now new varieties of pedas available, including hazelnut and walnut flavored options. Other dairy products that share similarities with peda are Kunda, Thabdi, Bal mithai, and Kalakand. While Pedas are commonly found in most sweet stores throughout India, there are also large-scale dairy producers such as Amul, Nandini and Mother Dairy that are involved in the production of peda.

Consumption customs 

It is a dessert consumed on various occasions such as festivals like Ganesh Chaturthi, Diwali, Rakhsha Bandhan, baby arrivals or weddings. It is distributed especially when a boy child is born. It is also one of the most popular sweets offered to Lord Krishna during Krishna Janmashtami, festival that celebrates the birth of Lord Krishna.

In religion 

As with laddoos, pedas are sometimes used as prasadam in religious services.

It is believed to be Lord Krishna’s favourite sweet and is widely consumed during Krishna Janmashtami. There is a popular story that has been passed down for ages of how Peda was first made.  Lord Krishna’s mother Yoshada forgot to turn off the milk that she was boiling. By the time she remembered it, the milk had thickened considerably. To salvage it, she decided to add sugar and give it to Lord Krishna. It is believed that Krishna liked it so much that the tradition of offering Peda to Lord Krishna began in Mathura, the birth place of Krishna.

References

Indian desserts
Uttar Pradeshi cuisine
Gujarati cuisine
Nepalese cuisine
Confectionery
Guyanese cuisine
Fijian desserts